Vladimir Struzhanov (2 August 1932 – 19 April 2014) was a Russian swimmer who competed in the 1956 Summer Olympics.

References

1932 births
2014 deaths
Russian male swimmers
Russian male freestyle swimmers
Olympic swimmers of the Soviet Union
Swimmers at the 1956 Summer Olympics
Olympic bronze medalists for the Soviet Union
Olympic bronze medalists in swimming
European Aquatics Championships medalists in swimming
Medalists at the 1956 Summer Olympics
Soviet male swimmers